Margaret Bennett is the name of:

Margaret Bennett (figure skater) (1910–1984), American figure skater
Margaret Bennett (writer) (born 1946), Scottish writer
Margaret Stephanie Bennett, English film producer
Peggy Bennett (born 1958), American political candidate

Fiction
Margaret Bennett, a character in the television series E Street
Maggie Bennett, fictional character in a novel series by Anne Stuart